Tangye is a surname of Breton origin and is common in Cornwall. It may refer to:

 Richard Tangye, industrialist (1833–1906)
His son, Sir , 1st Baronet (1866–1935)
His son, Sir , 2nd Baronet (1895–1969)
 His son, Lt. Colonel  O.B.E., JP
 His son Derek Tangye
 Derek's wife Jean Tangye
 His son Nigel Tangye 
 His niece, Helena Tangye Lean
 Her son Edward Tangye Lean
 Her son David Tangye Lean, aka David Lean
 George Tangye, Richard's brother

See also 

 Tangye baronets
 Tanguy

References

Further reading
Scott, Tim, ed. (1999) Cornish Connections: the Tangye checklist; Derek Tangye, Jean Nicol-Tangye & Nigel Tangye; 2nd ed. Wokingham: Cornish Connections / Hare's Ear  (1st ed. 1997)

Surnames of Breton origin
Cornish families